Blessed Maria Teresa of Saint Joseph (19 June 1855 - 20 September 1938) - Anna Maria Tauscher van den Bosch was a German Roman Catholic professed religious and the founder of the Carmelite Sisters of the Divine Heart of Jesus. Tauscher worked in Cologne and was removed from her position after she converted to Roman Catholicism in 1888 so founded a religious order in the Netherlands upon choosing the Carmelite charism for her life.

Her beatification was held in mid-2006 in the Netherlands.

Life
Anna Maria Tauscher van den Bosch was born in the German Confederation on 19 June 1855 to Hermann Traugott Tauscher and Pauline van den Bosch. Tauscher came from a religious background for her father was a Protestant pastor.

From 1885 to 1888 she worked with those suffering mental disabilities at an institution in Cologne, but lost her job following her conversion. On 30 October 1888 she was baptized into the Roman Catholic Church. Tauscher founded the Carmelite Sisters of the Divine Heart of Jesus on 2 July 1891 after having opened a home for neglected children just prior to that in Berlin. She made her vows in 1893. The nun took for a model Saint Teresa of Ávila. Her new order took on the Carmelite charism to the fullest and coupled it with apostolic service. Her concern was directed to poor and neglected children in addition to families and individuals who had left the Church. Her order was also focused on immigrants and the aged. She published 'The Servant of God'.

Tauscher moved to the Netherlands in 1899 to expand her congregation and to continue her work; the order was later aggregated to the Discalced Carmelites on 25 October 1904 and it later received the decree of praise from Pope Pius X on 9 May 1910. Pope Pius XI granted papal approval to the order on 12 May 1930.

Tauscher died on 20 September 1938. In 2005 there were 454 religious in 53 houses in nations such as Iceland and Nicaragua.

Beatification
The beatification process opened in Roermond in an informative process that was launched in the diocese on 2 February 1953 and was later concluded on 20 September 1957; the Congregation for the Causes of Saints validated this process in Rome on 15 May 1987 while later receiving the Positio dossier from the postulation in 1992. Theologians assented to the cause on 25 June 2002 as did the C.C.S. members on 1 October 2002. The confirmation of her life of heroic virtue allowed for Pope John Paul II to title her as Venerable on 20 December 2002.

The process for a miracle spanned from 14 to 27 March 2002 and this received C.C.S. validation on 4 October 2002. A medical board approved the miracle on 11 March 2004 with theologians to follow on 10 July 2004; the C.C.S. also supported it on 11 January 2005. Pope Benedict XVI approved this on 19 December 2005 and delegated Cardinal Adrianus Johannes Simonis to preside over the beatification in the Netherlands on 13 May 2006. Her liturgical feast was not affixed to her date of death as is the norm but on the date of her entrance into the Church.

The current postulator for this cause is Fr. Bonifatius Honings.

References

External links
Hagiography Circle
Saints SQPN

1855 births
1938 deaths
19th-century venerated Christians
20th-century German Roman Catholic nuns
20th-century venerated Christians
20th-century German people
Beatifications by Pope Benedict XVI
Founders of Catholic religious communities
German beatified people
19th-century German Roman Catholic nuns
People from Brandenburg
Venerated Catholics by Pope John Paul II
Venerated Carmelites
German emigrants to the Netherlands